Bangladesh Gas Fields Company Limited is a Bangladesh government owned major gas fields company and is held by Petrobangla. It owns Titas Gas Field, Habiganj Gas Field, Bakhrabad Gas Field, Narsingdi Gas Field, Meghna Gas Field, Kamta Gas Field, and Sangu Gas Fields.

History
Bangladesh Gas Fields Company Limited traces its origins to the operations of Shell Oil Company in Bangladesh. On 7 August 1975, the Government of Bangladesh bought the gas fields owned by Shell Oil Company. On 12 September 1975, Bangladesh Gas Fields Company Limited was established to take over the operations of the gas fields. It currently produces 725 million standard cubic feet of gas daily in Bangladesh. The wells of the company and Sylhet Gas Field Limited, the other state owned gas field company,  are outdated and narrow which has hampered production.

References

External links 

 Official Website 

Organisations based in Dhaka
Government-owned companies of Bangladesh
Oil and gas companies of Bangladesh
Bangladeshi companies established in 1975
Energy companies established in 1975